Fawzi Gamal  is an Egyptian retired footballer.

Career
Fawzi played club football for Ismaily.

He was also part of the Egypt national football team at 4 successive African Cup of Nations, 1990, 1992
, 1994 and 1996. He also played in 1994 FIFA World Cup qualification.

References

External links

Living people
Egyptian footballers
Egyptian football managers
Ismaily SC players
1990 African Cup of Nations players
1992 African Cup of Nations players
1994 African Cup of Nations players
1996 African Cup of Nations players
1966 births
Egyptian Premier League players
Association football defenders
Egypt international footballers